Bahram Gushnasp, known in Byzantine sources as Bargousnas, was an Iranian military officer from the House of Mihran.

He is first mentioned during an unknown date, where he campaigned against the Himyarites, and was quite successful; he managed to capture the Himyarite king Sanatources, sack his capital and take many captives. He is later mentioned in 573, as the head of the Sasanian garrison in the important city of Nisibis, when it was besieged by the Byzantine general Marcian. With the help of several other tribes, Bahram Gushnasp fought Marcian at Sargathon, a place near Nisibis. He was, however, defeated and is not mentioned in any source after that.

It is known that he had several children named Mardansina, Gorduya, Gordiya. His most famous child was Bahram Chobin, who would later occupy high offices in the Sasanian state, and even manage to overthrow the Sasanian king himself in 590–591.

Sources

Year of death unknown
People of the Roman–Sasanian Wars
Year of birth unknown
6th-century Iranian people
House of Mihran
People from Ray, Iran
Generals of Khosrow I